Alviyanto Prastyadi (born 18 February 2002) is an Indonesian archer. He competed in the men's individual event at the 2020 Summer Olympics.

References

External links
 

2002 births
Living people
Indonesian male archers
Olympic archers of Indonesia
Archers at the 2020 Summer Olympics
People from Klaten Regency
Southeast Asian Games gold medalists for Indonesia
Southeast Asian Games medalists in archery
Competitors at the 2021 Southeast Asian Games
Islamic Solidarity Games medalists in archery
21st-century Indonesian people